Arab Banking Corporation (also called Bank ABC) is an international bank with headquarters in the Diplomatic Area of Manama, in Bahrain. It was incorporated as a joint stock company in 1980 through a special decree by the Amir of Bahrain. It obtained an offshore banking unit licence from the Bahrain Monetary Agency on 7 April 1980, and began operations in the same month. The bank is listed on the Bahrain Bourse and its major shareholders are the Central Bank of Libya  (59.37%) and Kuwait Investment Authority (40.63%). Its network spreads across 17 countries in the Middle East and North Africa (MENA), Europe, the Americas and Asia. It is expanding its retail banking network in the MENA region.

Bank ABC is a provider of trade finance, treasury, project and structured finance, syndications, corporate and institutional banking as well as Islamic banking services.

History
By April 1981, US$750 million had been fully paid by Bank ABC's original three shareholders: the Ministry of Finance of Kuwait (whose shares have since been transferred to the Kuwait Investment Authority), the Libyan Secretariat of Treasury (whose shares were later transferred to the Central Bank of Libya) and the Abu Dhabi Investment Authority. At the end of 1989, ABC's authorised share capital was increased to US$1.50 Billion and in June 1990, paid-up capital was raised to US$1.00 Billion through an international share offering. In June 2006, ABC's shares were split 10 for 1 in order to boost trading activities by placing them in the same range as other shares quoted on the Bahrain Bourse.

At an Extraordinary General Meeting held in April 2008 ABC's shareholders approved an increase in the authorized capital of the bank from US$1.5 billion to US$2.5 billion and an increase in issued and paid up capital from US$1.0 billion to US$2.0 billion by way of a priority rights share offering to existing shareholders. Another Extraordinary General Meeting was held on January 28, 2010 to approve an increase in the authorized capital from US$2.5 billion to US$3.5 billion and an increase in issued and paid up capital from US$2.0 billion to US$3.11 billion by way of a priority rights share offering to existing shareholders.

In December 2010 the Central Bank of Libya acquired the 17.72% shareholding of Abu Dhabi Investment Authority in ABC, increasing its stake to 59.37%.

In June 2015 Arab Banking Corporation revamped its corporate identity and changed its brand name to Bank ABC. The bank's new identity launch coincides with the commemoration of its 35th anniversary.
The change to a single, unifying global brand name and corporate identity took effect on 15 June 2015 across the Bank's global network spanning 18 countries in the Middle East and North Africa (MENA), Europe, the Americas and Asia (with the exception of its subsidiary in Brazil, which will keep its own identity as Banco ABC Brasil).
The legal names of the Arab Banking Corporation and its subsidiaries did not change.

In March 2022 during the EGM, Bank ABC obtained the shareholders’ approval for an issuance of US$390 million AT1 securities, which will increase the Bank’s Tier 1 capital ratio by approximately 130 basis points, taking it back above 17%. Additionally, the Bank obtained the shareholders’ approval to increase its authorised share capital from US$3.5 billion to US$4.5 billion.

See also

List of banks in Bahrain

References

External links
 ABC Official website (Global)

Banks established in 1980
Banks of Bahrain
Companies listed on the Bahrain Bourse
Companies based in Manama
Bahraini companies established in 1980
Companies listed on the Amman Stock Exchange